Operation Finch was a series of operations undertaken by the Services Reconnaissance Department in World War II.

References

Finch